The Baker, also known as Massala, is a historic apartment building located at Indianapolis, Indiana.  It was built in 1905, and is a three-story, 10-bay by 12 bay, Classical Revival style brick building with Queen Anne style design elements.  It has limestone detailing and features paired two-story bay windows on the upper floors.

It was listed on the National Register of Historic Places in 1983.  It is located in the Massachusetts Avenue Commercial District.

References

External links

Apartment buildings in Indiana
Individually listed contributing properties to historic districts on the National Register in Indiana
Residential buildings on the National Register of Historic Places in Indiana
Residential buildings completed in 1905
Queen Anne architecture in Indiana
Neoclassical architecture in Indiana
Residential buildings in Indianapolis
National Register of Historic Places in Indianapolis
1905 establishments in Indiana